Perry Nisen, M.D., Ph.D., is an American physician who is the former Chief Executive Officer (CEO) of the Sanford Burnham Prebys Medical Discovery Institute  (SBP). He was appointed as CEO in August 2014, and held the Donald Bren Chief Executive Chair.

Early life and education
 B.S. from Stanford University
 M.D. and Ph.D. from the Albert Einstein College of Medicine
 Residency, Columbia University College of Physicians and Surgeons

Career
Before joining SBP, Dr. Nisen was Senior Vice President of Science and Innovation at GlaxoSmithKline (GSK). In this role, he facilitated innovation and integration of R&D across GSK's global organization and contributed to the discovery, development and commercialization of many drugs. Earlier in his career at GSK, he held various key positions, including interim Chief Medical Officer, Senior Vice President and Oncology Therapy Area Head, Senior Vice President of Cancer Research, and Senior Vice President of Clinical Pharmacology and Discovery Medicine.

Previously, Dr. Nisen was Divisional Vice President of Cancer Research and Oncology Development at Abbott Laboratories, where he helped build a Cancer Discovery organization and created a pipeline of clinical candidates.

Formerly, he was the Lowe Foundation Professor of Neuro-Oncology at the University of Texas Southwestern Medical Center. He headed a basic research laboratory and was a practicing physician in pediatric hematology-oncology.  He was a  member of the Genetics and Development Graduate Training Program.

Awards and honors
 Alpha Omega Alpha
 Macintosh Fellowship, Columbia University College of Physicians and Surgeons
 Basil O'Connor Research Award of the March of Dimes
 Lowe Foundation Professorship UT Southwestern
 Woodward Visiting Scholar, Harvard University

Directorships
Dr. Nisen is a member of the Board of Directors of Teva Pharmaceuticals (TEVA), Mirna (MIRN), Biocom, and several Scientific Advisory Boards.

Certification and licensure
Specialty: Pediatrics

Subspecialty: Pediatric Hematology-Oncology

American Board of Pediatrics

Certified in Pediatrics, Pediatric Hematology-Oncology (lapsed)

CA State Medical License ─ Active through 2018

References

American chief executives
Living people
Stanford University alumni
Albert Einstein College of Medicine alumni
American molecular biologists
Cancer researchers
1955 births